Jovelian de Koker (born 28 February 1992) is a South African rugby union player for Marmande in Fédérale 1 in France. His regular position is scrum-half.

Career

Youth / Club rugby

De Koker's first provincial selection came when he appeared for the Wellington-based  side during the 2011 Under-19 Provincial Championship. He made two appearances from the bench as they finished in fifth place in Group B, outside the play-off spots.

However, it was another disappointing season and Boland finished sixth on the log.

At the start of 2013, De Koker represented Villagers Worcester in the inaugural edition of the SARU Community Cup competition. He started all four matches and scored consolation tries in their matches against Despatch and College Rovers, but Villagers finished in fourth spot and failed to qualify for the finals. He once again represented  in the 2013 Under-21 Provincial Championship, making six starts and three appearances from the bench.

Senior career

De Koker made the step up to the senior side and made his first class debut for the  during the 2014 Vodacom Cup competition, appearing as a replacement in their 8–16 defeat to Western Cape rivals . He made a further three appearances from the bench as Boland finished in sixth spot, missing out on the semi-finals.

He made two more starts and one appearance off the bench, but once again missed out on the play-offs, by one point to eventual finalists .

De Koker began the 2015 Vodacom Cup as first-choice scrum-half for the Boland Cavaliers, starting their first three matches of the campaign.

References

South African rugby union players
Living people
1992 births
Rugby union players from Worcester, South Africa
Rugby union scrum-halves
Boland Cavaliers players